New Bellary Airport is a proposed greenfield airport, which will serve the city of Bellary in Karnataka, India. As of March 2020, the survey work has been started. The runway at the existing Bellary Airport is too short and narrow, and there is no room for its expansion. The area of the airport is around 900 acres. The new airport will be the 10th airport of Karnataka.

Proposed in 2008, the airport project met strong resistance from farmers, as the airport would be built on their fertile lands. Progress on the project slowed in 2012, but resumed in 2014, with the land acquisition issues apparently settled.

The survey work has been started and as per the MARG banner at the site, the airport is named as 'Sri Krishnadevaraya Airport'. It is named after Krishnadevaraya, who was the king of the Vijayanagara Empire.

History
In September 2008, the Government of Karnataka approved a proposal to build a new airport for Bellary under the public–private partnership model. The State Government began inviting bids for assistance from the private sector in December 2008. In that same month, Airports Authority of India officials who had arrived to survey the land designated for the project were turned away by protesting farmers, who objected to the location of the airport on their fertile lands. Violent protests erupted in February 2009.

In July 2009, however, some farmers said they were willing to give their land to the State as long as proper compensation was received. Construction company MARG won the contract to build the airport, and the foundation stone was laid on 20 August 2010. MARG said it would invest , of which  would be spent on the initial phase. This phase would encompass the construction of a terminal building with a capacity for 100 passengers and an apron with 6–8 parking stands. The airport would be able to handle ATR aircraft.

In January 2012, the Karnataka High Court rejected the State Government's notifications to obtain  of land for the airport. The petitioners noted that Air Deccan had suffered low occupancy on its flights to Toranagallu and that Bellary was equidistant from two airports, the ones in Bangalore and Hyderabad. The loss of land made it impossible to lay the runway for the new airport. By June 2013, MARG had walked out on the project. Farmers who had given away their land decided to continue cultivating it as progress on the airport had halted.

The Infrastructure Development Department of the State Government revived the project in mid-2014, upon learning that MARG had expressed renewed interest in it and was willing to survey the land. The survey began in September 2014. In August 2015, the Department said that land acquisition issues had been resolved and that work on the greenfield airport would begin following the completion of Gulbarga Airport.

Around 900 acres have been earmarked for the project with the State reserving Rs 150 crore for the initial funding. The survey work began on March 20 and is expected to be completed soon. Currently, the airport runway will be equipped to handle the ATR-72 fleet but will gradually be extended to allow the Airbus 320

References

Bellary
Airports in Karnataka
Proposed airports in Karnataka
Buildings and structures in Bellary district
Transport in Bellary district